Yuttana Ruangsuksut (born 29 August 1989), simply known as Ron, is a Thai professional footballer who plays as a forward for Thai League 3 club Kasem Bundit University .

Honours

Club
Nakhon Ratchasima
 Thai League 2 (1): 2014

External links
 

1989 births
Living people
Yuttana Ruangsuksut
Yuttana Ruangsuksut
Yuttana Ruangsuksut
Association football forwards
Yuttana Ruangsuksut
Yuttana Ruangsuksut
Yuttana Ruangsuksut
Yuttana Ruangsuksut
Yuttana Ruangsuksut